A hypotonic-hyporesponsive episode (HHE) is defined as sudden onset of poor muscle tone, reduced consciousness, and pale or bluish skin occurring within 48 hours after vaccination, most commonly pertussis vaccination. An HHE is estimated to occur after 1 in 4,762 to 1 in 1,408 doses of whole cell pertussis vaccine, and after 1 in 14,286 to 1 in 2,778 doses of acellular pertussis vaccine.

References

Vaccination
Symptoms and signs: Nervous system